The Oak Room is a 2020 Canadian thriller film directed by Cody Calahan, produced by Citizen Skull Productions and starring RJ Mitte, Ari Millen, Martin Roach, Nicholas Campbell, David Ferry and Peter Outerbridge.  It is based on Peter Genoway's play of the same name.

Cast
RJ Mitte
Peter Outerbridge
Ari Millen
Martin Roach as Richard
David Ferry
Nicholas Campbell
Amos Crawley
Avery Esteves
Coal Campbell

Release
The film premiered at the Fantasia International Film Festival in August 2020.

Reception
The website's critics consensus reads: "The Oak Room contains a taut, spooky tale that proves southern gothic can flourish in the snowy north." Brian Shaer of Film Threat gave the film a 6.5 out of 10. Drew Tinnin of Dread Central awarded the film three and a half stars out of five. Meagan Navarro of Bloody Disgusting awarded the film three skulls out of five.

Martin Unsworth of Starburst gave the film a positive review and wrote, "...The Oak Room is no facsimile and always feels its own beast. The direction is taut, building the atmosphere gradually until the tension is practically smothering during the denouement - a final shot that rivals Blood Simple for satisfaction."

Andrew Mack of Screen Anarchy also gave the film a positive review and wrote, "The film proves once again that sometimes all you need is a good story to captivate your audience. The Oak Room has at least three."

References

External links
 
 

Canadian thriller films
2020 thriller films
Canadian films based on plays
English-language Canadian films
2020s English-language films
2020s Canadian films